Zsolt Máté (born 14 September 1997) is a Hungarian footballer who plays as a defender for Tiszakécske on loan from Újpest FC.

Career statistics

References

External links
 
 
 Zsolt Máté at Magyarfutball.hu

1997 births
Living people
People from Szabadszállás
Hungarian footballers
Association football defenders
Budapest Honvéd FC players
Újpest FC players
Tiszakécske FC footballers
Nemzeti Bajnokság I players
Nemzeti Bajnokság II players
Sportspeople from Bács-Kiskun County